The following is a list of governors of Luxembourg.

From the 15th to the 19th centuries, the Duchy (later Grand-Duchy) of Luxembourg was ruled by the French, the Burgundians, the Spanish and Austrian Habsburgs, and the Dutch.

From 1848 onwards, when Luxembourg received its first constitution, it started to be administered by a government in the modern sense of the word, one which was accountable to an elected Luxembourgish legislature.

See also

 List of prime ministers of Luxembourg

Luxembourg
Luxembourg history-related lists